is a video game developed for the PlayStation system, created by the Japanese company Neorex, which became famous after receiving the dishonor of a "0.0 out of 10.0" rating in Game Players magazine. The game was released in 1995 in Japan only. Cosmic Race is the only game produced by Neorex.

Gameplay 

Cosmic Race is a spaceship-racing game.

Development and release

Reception 

Cosmic Race is notorious for being one of the worst video games of all time.  Criticisms of the game include the strange controls (the player must press the R1 button to move forward), the poor graphics that were taken from the PlayStation developer's kit, and the poor collision detection.

Next Generation reviewed the game, rating it one star out of five, and stated that "Although there are only a few titles available on the PlayStation, it is obvious, in comparison, that Cosmic Race is substandard on almost every level. The graphics are childish and uninspired and the control is entirely awkward. If all were right with the world, this game would never have been made."

The game was reviewed in Game Players issue #88, published September 1996, which was the last issue published under the name "Game Players." In it, the reviews section was prefaced (as usual) with a list of the possible ratings (0.0-10.0). In each issue ratings 1.0-10.0 would have humorous real world analogs. The rating of 0.0 had been described for quite a while as simply "Cosmic Race." Since this was the final issue of Game Players under its original name, they decided to commemorate the occasion by finally giving the game a proper review. The review was written by Chris Charla, who bemoaned long loading times, poor graphics which were taken directly from the PlayStation SDK ("your mom could do better graphics than this. Seriously."), a non-intuitive control system, and a complete lack of collision detection (allowing you to "fly under the world").

Notes

References

External links 
 Cosmic Race at GameFAQs
 Cosmic Race at Giant Bomb
 Cosmic Race at MobyGames

1995 video games
Japan-exclusive video games
PlayStation (console) games
PlayStation (console)-only games
Racing video games
Video games developed in Japan